Semorina is a genus of South American jumping spiders that was first described by Eugène Louis Simon in 1901.

Species
 it contains five species, found only in Argentina and Venezuela:
Semorina brachychelyne Crane, 1949 – Venezuela
Semorina iris Simon, 1901 – Venezuela
Semorina lineata Mello-Leitão, 1945 – Argentina
Semorina megachelyne Crane, 1949 – Venezuela
Semorina seminuda Simon, 1901 (type) – Venezuela

References

Salticidae genera
Salticidae
Spiders of South America